Chapman's is a Canadian manufacturer of ice cream. It is the largest independent ice cream and ice water manufacturer in Canada. Chapman's produces products under the company brand name, as well as store brand products. They are also known for their range of ice creams for people with special dietary needs. Chapman's products are distributed nationally. 

The company was founded by David and Penny Chapman in 1973. Their son, Ashley, currently runs the business.

History 
In 1973, David and Penny Chapman purchased the Creamery in Markdale, Ontario, a village just south of Georgian Bay. The company started out as a small creamery with four employees and two trucks.

In 2001, a distribution center was opened in New Brunswick to better serve Chapman's Atlantic Canada.

On September 4, 2009, a major fire gutted the Chapman's creamery. No employees were hurt in the blaze.  Chapman's had been using a smaller plant since the fire.

On September 4, 2010 they opened its new facility on the anniversary of the destruction of the old plant. The smaller plant was converted into a nut facility, while the addition of the new plant became a nut-free facility (the larger of the two plants is about quadruple the size of the old one) allowed the hiring of 50 to 100 new employees.

During the COVID-19 pandemic, when the Pfizer and Moderna vaccines were being readied for distribution, which require strong refrigeration for storage, Chapman's volunteered the use of their industrial freezers for the Grey Bruce Health Unit for the vials. When the company decided upon a vaccine mandate where any unvaccinated employees must submit to a company paid COVID-19 rapid antigen test twice a week, while their vaccinated employees would get a $1 raise as the equivalent compensation for the cost of the tests, the company was subject to calls for a boycott by anti-vaccination groups.  However, there was also a wave of public support around Canada for the business in reaction to this hostility, although it was not clear how the activism of either side was affecting sales. Company vice-president Ashley Chapman said on CBC Radio's As It Happens that the boycott had no effect on the company's bottom line.

Facilities 
Productions centred in Markdale, with two plants located in the town, the  smaller plant is a nut facility, while the larger  plant is nut-free. The company also operates a  distribution centre south of town on Highway 10. There is another distribution centre in Hampton, New Brunswick to serve the Atlantic provinces. Chapman's owns a wastewater treatment plant to purify  of wastewater daily produced from the cleaning and production processes.

References

External links
"The Story of Chapman's Ice Cream" at the official website
A mention of the company in the Ontario Legislative Assembly
An article describing how their waste water is treated
Tourist information and a brief company history
 Technical article describing their water treatment system

Food and drink companies established in 1973
Food and drink companies of Canada
Ice cream brands
1973 establishments in Ontario
Dairy products companies of Canada